Charlotte FC is an American professional soccer club based in Charlotte. The team competes in Major League Soccer (MLS) as a member of the league's Eastern Conference. The team is owned by David Tepper, who was awarded the expansion franchise on December 17, 2019. It began play in the 2022 MLS season as the league's 28th franchise. Charlotte FC plays at Bank of America Stadium, which it shares with the Carolina Panthers of the National Football League, a team also owned by Tepper; the stadium capacity is reduced to 38,000 for most matches. The team holds the MLS record for standalone match attendance, with 74,479 at their inaugural home match.

History

Soccer in Charlotte

The Charlotte area has been home to several lower-division soccer teams, dating back to the Carolina Lightnin' in the early 1980s. The Lightnin' won the American Soccer League championship in 1981 in front of 20,163 people at American Legion Memorial Stadium. It marked Charlotte's first professional sports championship. After the league folded in 1983, the team played for one season as the Charlotte Gold in United Soccer League before ceasing operations. Professional soccer did not return to Charlotte until the founding of the Charlotte Eagles in 1991, who joined the USISL in 1993.

Charlotte was on the list of cities interested in joining Major League Soccer (MLS) in 1994, prior to the league's inaugural season, but was not awarded a franchise. Charlotte was also named as a potential home for an expansion team in both 1996 and 1998, but was passed over in favor of other cities. The Charlotte Convention Center hosted the MLS SuperDraft and National Soccer Coaches Association of America conference in January 2004. Since a renovation to Bank of America Stadium in 2014, the city has hosted several friendly and international matches, including the CONCACAF Gold Cup and the International Champions Cup, which drew strong attendance figures. The area also has a large soccer-playing population, centered around recreational leagues that have led other efforts to attract a professional team to Charlotte.

Unsuccessful MLS bids

A separate professional team, the Charlotte Independence, was founded in 2014 and replaced the Eagles in the second division (now named the USL Championship). The team moved into a permanent soccer stadium in Matthews, North Carolina, in 2017. The Independence's ownership group had expressed their goal of winning an MLS expansion team when the club was founded, and proposed a major renovation to American Legion Memorial Stadium in 2015 that would make it into soccer-specific stadium. The team hired a sports investment firm in October 2016 to advertise the MLS bid to potential investors while preparing further stadium plans.

A separate Charlotte bid was formed in late 2016 by Marcus G. Smith of Speedway Motorsports, the owners of the Charlotte Motor Speedway, with support from local business leaders. The bid proposed building a new stadium at the Memorial Stadium site with 20,000 to 30,000 seats that would cost $175 million, including $87.5 million funded by the city and county governments and a $75 million loan to the ownership group. The Mecklenburg County Board of Commissioners voted 5–3 in favor of the stadium plan, while the Charlotte City Council decided against a vote on the issue before the bid deadline on January 31, 2017.

Smith submitted the bid without the city council's support, instead relying on the county government's funding plan. Several league officials toured Charlotte in July 2017, but the city council and county commissioners both canceled their meetings during the tour. Charlotte also faced competition from a bid submitted by Raleigh, North Carolina, who were also part of the twelve-city shortlist and had support from the state government. The Mecklenburg County government voted in August against their financial contribution to the stadium project in favor of deferring the issue to the city government, who declined to vote on the issue. MLS narrowed its shortlist of candidates in November 2017 to four cities, leaving out Charlotte.

Expansion bid under Tepper

David Tepper, who had purchased a 5% stake in the Pittsburgh Steelers in 2009, became the owner of the National Football League's Carolina Panthers in July 2018 and suggested his interest in bringing Major League Soccer to Charlotte. The Panthers' new team president, Tom Glick, was formerly the chief operating officer of Manchester City F.C. and was also involved in the MLS expansion bid for New York City FC. Glick was placed in charge of organizing an MLS expansion bid for Tepper, who had several meetings with league officials before the next bidding window was opened in April 2019.

Tepper presented a formal expansion bid for Charlotte to the league in July 2019, shortly before meetings with league officials and additional tours of Bank of America Stadium. He announced plans in September to upgrade the existing Bank of America Stadium to make it suitable for an MLS team, which would include up to $210 million in contributions from the city government. Tepper also discussed constructing a new stadium for the Panthers and a soccer team that would have a retractable roof. In November, MLS commissioner Don Garber named Charlotte as the frontrunner to earn the slot for the 30th team, praising Tepper's efforts and the bid's plans.

The Charlotte City Council approved $110 million in stadium and franchise funding in late November, using revenue from a hospitality tax. The MLS Board of Governors convened in early December to discuss the Charlotte bid and authorized final negotiations with Tepper. The expansion team was officially awarded to Charlotte by MLS at an event at the Mint Museum on December 17, 2019, with the team to begin play in 2021. The expansion fee to be paid by Tepper is reported to be near $325 million, a 62.5 percent increase from what was paid by the successful bids for St. Louis and Sacramento earlier in the year. The team sold 7,000 season ticket deposits in the first 24 hours after the expansion announcement. On July 17, 2020, MLS announced that the Charlotte expansion team's debut would be delayed by a year to 2022 due to the COVID-19 pandemic.

Inaugural season

The club signed its first player, Spanish midfielder Sergio Ruiz, from Racing Santander on July 8, 2020; he was immediately loaned out to UD Las Palmas for 18 months, with an expected arrival in Charlotte in January 2022. Spanish manager Miguel Ángel Ramírez was hired as the team's first head coach in July 2021. Charlotte FC signed its first Designated Player, Polish forward Karol Świderski, on January 26, 2022. Joe LaBue, a Carolina Panthers sales executive, was appointed club president in February 2022 to replace Glick after his departure. According to a FIFA report, Charlotte FC spent the most in transfer fees of any club in the CONCACAF region in 2022.

Charlotte FC played their first MLS regular season match on February 26, 2022, losing 3–0 to D.C. United at Audi Field. The club's home debut at Bank of America Stadium, a 1–0 loss to LA Galaxy on March 5, was played before a crowd of 74,479, the largest single-match crowd in MLS history. At the time, it was also the second-largest crowd to attend a match anywhere in the world in 2022. Adam Armour scored the club's first goal on March 13 in a 2–1 loss to Atlanta United FC. Charlotte's first win came on March 19 against the 2021 Supporters Shield holders New England Revolution, winning 3–1 at home.

Ramírez was fired on May 31 after 14 matches; at the time, Charlotte was tied for eighth in the Eastern Conference, one place short of playoff qualification. Assistant coach Christian Lattanzio was named interim head coach and led the club to defeat the New York Red Bulls in his first match. Charlotte FC earned their first away win, a 2–1 victory over Houston Dynamo FC, on July 3 after seven losses and two draws. The club remained in contention for a playoff spot until the penultimate matchday of the season, but were eliminated by a 2–2 draw with the Columbus Crew. Charlotte FC finished their inaugural season with a 13 wins, 18 losses, and 3 draws and were ninth place in the Eastern Conference. Lattanzio was signed as permanent head coach through 2024, having amassed an 8–10–2 record.

Club identity

In December 2019, several media outlets reported that Tepper Sports had submitted a trademark filing that included eight potential names: Charlotte FC, Charlotte Crown FC, Charlotte Fortune FC, Charlotte Monarchs FC, Charlotte Athletic FC, Charlotte Town FC, Carolina Gliders FC, and All Carolina FC. A name announcement was scheduled for June 2020, but was delayed a month due to the COVID-19 pandemic. The name and crest were revealed during a livestream event on July 22, 2020, with Charlotte Football Club (shortened to Charlotte FC) chosen as the winner.

The club's crest was designed by Doubleday & Cartwright and consists of a black roundel with a Process Blue center, the same shade of blue used by the Carolina Panthers. The shape, resembling a coin, and use of "Minted 2022" in the crest are references to the city's banking industry and the historic Charlotte Mint, the first U.S. Mint branch. At the center is a four-pointed crown, referencing the four wards of Uptown Charlotte and the city's nickname of the "Queen City", itself referencing namesake Charlotte of Mecklenburg-Strelitz.

The bid organizers signed a multi-year kit sponsorship agreement with Ally Financial in July 2019 for the then-unannounced MLS team.

Stadium

Charlotte FC plays at Bank of America Stadium, a 74,867-seat stadium that is also home to the Carolina Panthers of the National Football League; the Panthers are also owned by Tepper. For most matches, the club only uses the lower bowl and club sections of the stadium, capping capacity at 38,000 seats. For major matches, such as the 2022 home opener, the club expands the stadium to full capacity by opening the upper bowl.

A renovation to accommodate the club began in March 2021 and was completed in early 2022, adding dedicated locker rooms and training rooms for soccer, a player tunnel at midfield, and a larger concourse area. It cost $50 million to construct, with funding from Tepper Sports and the city government. A dedicated section for supporters' groups is located behind the goal on the east side of the stadium. The stadium's grass surface was replaced with FieldTurf in 2021 due to the additional wear expected from hosting MLS matches.

In February 2021, Charlotte FC announced that it would be the first MLS team to use personal seat licenses to reserve season tickets in most sections; the cost of seat licenses for the inaugural season was set at $550 per seat and would not be transferable to a potential new stadium. The announcement, along with high season ticket prices for the inaugural season, was met with backlash from fans.

Headquarters and training facility

The team's headquarters and practice facilities were initially planned to be located on the former site of the Eastland Mall, a city-owned property. In October 2020, the planned Eastland Mall facility was cancelled due to a reduction in financial incentives offered by the city government, including a tax reimbursement. The Eastland site was instead proposed as the home of the Charlotte FC Elite Academy, which would occupy  for youth soccer and other public sportsfields. Charlotte FC's headquarters were replaced with a building in the Uptown neighborhood, while the team would train at Sportsplex at Matthews until a permanent facility is built.

A new plan for the club's headquarters and training facility was announced in August 2022 for a site in southeastern Charlotte. The campus, planned to open in early 2023, will include  of space and four turf fields. for Charlotte FC, the reserve team, and academy teams.

Broadcasting

In April 2021, Charlotte FC announced its first local television partnership with the Cox Media Group. Most English broadcasts aired on WAXN-TV, with the remainder on WSOC-TV. The two stations fronted a network covering 11 markets in North and South Carolina. The Spanish broadcast was exclusive to  Telemundo Charlotte. Raycom Sports handled local production and syndication for the Charlotte FC television network. The English television broadcasting team consisted of play-by-play announcer Eric Krakauer, formerly of BeIN Sports; and color commentator Lloyd Sam, a former MLS player. The Spanish team consisted of play-by-play announcer Jamie Moreno and color analyst Antonio Ramos. Matches broadcast locally were also streamed on the club's website for viewers in most of North and South Carolina. Starting in 2023, Apple TV will have a 10-year exclusive rights to all MLS broadcast games online, which includes Charlotte FC in both English and Spanish.

In January 2022, Charlotte FC announced a radio partnership with Radio One's Charlotte cluster. Most English-language radio broadcasts air on WFNZ-FM, with the remainder on sister station WBT. They front a network of seven stations in North Carolina, South Carolina and Virginia. The English radio commentators for Charlotte FC matches are play-by-play announcer Will Palaszczuk and color analyst Jessica Charman. Radio broadcasts in Spanish are carried on WOLS and syndicated by Norsan Media to 11 stations in the Carolinas.

Ownership and management

Charlotte FC is owned by David Tepper, a billionaire manager and businessman who bought the National Football League's Carolina Panthers in 2018. Tepper is the wealthiest owner in both the NFL and MLS, with an estimated net worth of $12 billion. Zoran Krneta, a professional scout, was hired as the club's sporting director in December 2019. Former Carolina Dynamo head coach Marc Nicholls was named the club's technical director in January 2020 and directed the youth academy system until his departure two years later, prior to the inaugural season. Miguel Ángel Ramírez, formerly manager of Brazil's Sport Club Internacional, was hired as the team's first head coach in July 2021.

On May 31, the club announced that Ramírez had been fired. Assistant coach Christian Lattanzio was named interim head coach for the remainder of the season.

Club culture

Charlotte FC has five officially recognized supporters groups seated in the east end at Bank of America Stadium. The largest, Mint City Collective, was launched in June 2019 to support the MLS expansion bid. It was founded by several members of the Roaring Riot, a Panthers fan club, and has 2,000 members . The remaining recognized groups are Southbound and Crown, the Uptown Ultras, Carolina Hooliganz, and Blue Furia, a Latin American supporters' group. Other supporters clubs include the Queen's Firm, founded in 2017, and the QC Royals, founded in 2015 to support other minor league teams.

Starting with the inaugural season, a local celebrity is "crowned" as the "monarch" of the match. The first "Match Coronation" featured former Panthers player Steve Smith Sr. After every home win, the man of the match is crowned by the supporters section. Prior to first kick, fans in the supporters' section lock arms and perform the "Poznan" (a Polish supporters' dance) to the Faruko song "Pepas". The club's official mascot is Sir Minty, an anthropomorphic soccer ball that wears a crown, cape, and an oversized silver chain with an "M" medallion.

Players

Roster

Out on loan
{| class="wikitable sortable"
|-
! style="background-color:#0082CA; color:#FFFFFF; border:2px solid #000000;" scope="col"|No.
! style="background-color:#0082CA; color:#FFFFFF; border:2px solid #000000;" scope="col"|Pos.
! style="background-color:#0082CA; color:#FFFFFF; border:2px solid #000000;" scope="col"|Player
! style="background-color:#0082CA; color:#FFFFFF; border:2px solid #000000;" scope="col"|Nation
|-

Staff

Current technical staff 
{| class="wikitable"
|-
!style="background:#0082CA; color:#FFFFFF; border:3px solid #000000;" scope="col" colspan="2"|Executive

|-
!style="background:#0082CA; color:#FFFFFF; border:3px solid #000000;" scope="col" colspan="2"|Coaching staff

 
 
 
 

|-

Team records

Year-by-year

a. Avg. attendance include statistics from league matches only.
b. Top goalscorer(s) includes all goals scored in League, Playoffs, U.S. Open Cup, Leagues Cup, CONCACAF Champions League, FIFA Club World Cup, and other competitive continental matches.

Head coaches
 Includes regular season, playoff, CONCACAF Champions League, and U.S. Open Cup games.

Captains

References

External links

 

 
2019 establishments in North Carolina
Association football clubs established in 2022
Major League Soccer teams
Soccer clubs in North Carolina
Sports in Charlotte, North Carolina